Mindfuck may refer to: 

A synonym for mind games for a manipulative abusive purpose.
Operation Mindfuck, a principle of discordianism
Incredible Expanding Mindfuck, an experimental music group founded by Steven Wilson
I.E.M. (album), eponymous debut album of said group
"Mindfuck", a song by Ween, from their 1986 album The Crucial Squeegie Lip
"Mindfuck (A New Equation)", a song by The Coup, from their 2006 album Pick a Bigger Weapon
 Mindfuck, a supporting character in Adam Warren's Empowered.
"Mindfuck", a 2019 book by Christopher Wylie about the Facebook–Cambridge Analytica data scandal